Adiyaasambuugiin Tsolmon (born 7 November 1992) is a Mongolian judoka.

She competed at the 2016 Summer Olympics in Rio de Janeiro, in the women's 52 kg.

References

External links
 
 

1992 births
Living people
Mongolian female judoka
Olympic judoka of Mongolia
Judoka at the 2016 Summer Olympics
Judoka at the 2014 Asian Games
Asian Games competitors for Mongolia
21st-century Mongolian women